St. Paul is a city in Lee County, Iowa, United States.  The population was 109 at the time of the 2020 census.  It is part of the Fort Madison–Keokuk, IA-MO Micropolitan Statistical Area.

History
St. Paul was laid out in 1866.

Geography
St. Paul is located at  (40.766957, -91.516955).

Demographics

2010 census
At the 2010 census there were 129 people in 52 households, including 36 families, in the city. The racial makup of the city was 98.4% White, 0.8% Asian, and 0.8% from two or more races.

Of the 52 households 21.2% had children under the age of 18 living with them, 57.7% were married couples living together, 9.6% had a female householder with no husband present, 1.9% had a male householder with no wife present, and 30.8% were non-families. 28.8% of households were one person and 5.8% were one person aged 65 or older. The average household size was 2.48 and the average family size was 3.11.

The median age was 44.5 years. 21.7% of residents were under the age of 18; 6.3% were between the ages of 18 and 24; 22.5% were from 25 to 44; 33.4% were from 45 to 64; and 16.3% were 65 or older. The gender makeup of the city was 49.6% male and 50.4% female.

2000 census
At the 2000 census there were 118 people, 52 households, and 30 families residing in St. Paul. The racial makup of the city was 98.31% White, and 1.69% from two or more races.

Of the 52 households 28.8% had children under the age of 18 living with them, 53.8% were married couples living together, 3.8% had a female householder with no husband present, and 40.4% were non-families. 32.7% of households were one person and 17.3% were one person aged 65 or older. The average household size was 2.27 and the average family size was 2.97.

The age distribution was 22.9% under the age of 18, 3.4% from 18 to 24, 33.1% from 25 to 44, 24.6% from 45 to 64, and 16.1% 65 or older. The median age was 39 years. For every 100 females, there were 84.4 males. For every 100 females age 18 and over, there were 102.2 males.

The median household income was $45,313 and the median family income  was $58,750. Males had a median income of $37,188 versus $25,625 for females. The per capita income for the city was $20,312. There were no families and 3.9% of the population living below the poverty line, including no under eighteens and 14.3% of those over 64.

Education
Fort Madison Community School District serves the city; its high school is Fort Madison High School.

The Roman Catholic Holy Trinity Catholic Schools maintains a preschool campus and its sole elementary campus in West Point and the secondary school is in Fort Madison. Previously the Marquette Catholic School System maintained its middle school in St. Paul; in 2005 it merged into the Holy Trinity system. Previously Holy Trinity had its preschool in St. Paul.

Notable person
Sebastian Menke, Catholic priest who served as the tenth president of St. Ambrose College.

References

Cities in Lee County, Iowa
Cities in Iowa
Fort Madison–Keokuk, IA-IL-MO Micropolitan Statistical Area